"La Katangaise" was the national anthem of the State of Katanga. The music was composed by Joseph Kiwele who was Katanga's Minister of National Education.

Lyrics

References

National anthems
Historical national anthems
State of Katanga
History of Katanga
African anthems
1960 songs